Ruthless People is a 1986 American black comedy film directed by David Zucker, Jim Abrahams, and Jerry Zucker and written by Dale Launer. It stars Danny DeVito, Bette Midler, Judge Reinhold, Anita Morris, and Helen Slater, with Bill Pullman in a supporting role in his film debut. The film is the story of a couple who kidnap their ex-boss's wife to get revenge and extort money from him. They soon realize he does not want her back and was planning to kill her himself.  Meanwhile, the boss's mistress plans a blackmail attempt on him which also fails to go as planned.

This was the last film released under the Touchstone Films name before it was renamed to Touchstone Pictures by Disney.

Plot
Beverly Hills fashion tycoon Sam Stone despises his wife, Barbara, having married her for her family wealth, and plans to murder her so he can inherit her $15million fortune and retire with his mistress Carol Dodsworth. He returns home armed with chloroform but finds Barbara is missing and receives a call from her abductor, demanding $500,000 for her return and threatening to kill her if the police or media are involved. Hoping to get Barbara killed, Sam deliberately ignores the demands.

The abductors, Ken and Sandy Kessler, are a lower-class couple targeting Sam because he built his business using the Kesslers' life savings and fashion designs he stole from Sandy. They detain Barbara in their basement but she proves difficult to control, and Sandy feels guilty about their actions. Intending to financially blackmail Sam, Carol sends her lover Earl Mott to film Sam at the cliff from which he intended to dispose of Barbara, but, unaware of Sam's appearance, Earl unwittingly films a man having sex with a prostitute, mistaking her screams for Barbara dying. Without watching the tape, Carol forwards a copy to Sam who assumes it is a seductive birthday present, and she interprets his lewd response as a threat, causing her and Earl to go into hiding.

Bored and overweight, Barbara begins following television exercise programs. She is eventually overjoyed to realize she has lost  and bonds with Sandy after being impressed by her fashion ideas and dress designs, in which she now can fit. Meanwhile, Ken repeatedly drops the ransom price, eventually reaching $10,000, but Sam refuses to pay and encourages Ken to kill Barbara. Although Ken is confronted as a suspect because of tire tracks at the Stone residence, the investigation is redirected when Carol, hoping to incriminate Sam, sends another copy of the tape to police chief Henry Benton, unaware he is the man on the tape. Assuming he is being blackmailed, Benton has Sam investigated and arrested following the discovery of the chloroform and photos of him with Carol.

Realizing he is incapable of being a ruthless criminal, Ken returns home to collect Sandy and flee to Mexico. He learns that Sandy has released Barbara and they want to work together to develop and sell Sandy's fashion designs. The Bedroom Killer, a notorious local serial killer, invades their home and confronts them and Barbara as she returns, leading to an altercation in which he dies after falling down the basement stairs. Realizing that Sam wanted her dead and having learned of his affair, Barbara collaborates with Ken and Sandy to take revenge by blackmailing him for his entire personal fortune worth over $2.2million. After being bailed out of jail, Sam reluctantly collects the ransom in a briefcase, desperate to prove his innocence in Barbara's disappearance. Carol finally views the tape and, realizing Earl's mistake, reconnects with Sam to learn when the ransom handover will take place and that the cops, now distrustful of Sam, will not accompany him.

Earl ambushes Sam and a masked Ken at the exchange, but they are surrounded by scores of Swat officers, and Earl is arrested. Ken warns the cops that Barbara will be killed if they try to stop him, and drives off followed by a police convoy. Cornered, he drives off the end of the Santa Monica Pier and seemingly drowns. The police recover the body of the Bedroom Killer, disguised as Ken, from the car but are unable to locate the ransom money. Despite his loss, Sam is elated that Barbara must be dead until she arrives on the pier, identifies the Killer as her abductor, and throws Sam into the water. Elsewhere, Ken emerges from the ocean in scuba gear, carrying the briefcase, and celebrates with the waiting Sandy and Barbara.

Cast

 Danny DeVito as Sam Stone
 Bette Midler as Barbara Stone
 Judge Reinhold as Ken Kessler
 Helen Slater as Sandy Kessler
 Anita Morris as Carol Dodsworth
 Bill Pullman as Earl Mott
 William G. Schilling as police chief Henry Benton
 Art Evans as Lt. Bender
 Clarence Felder as Lt. Walters
 J. E. Freeman as Bedroom Killer
 Gary Riley as Heavy Metal Kid
 Phyllis Applegate as Loan officer

Production
The set design for the majority of the interiors of the home of Sam and Barbara Stone extensively employs the Italian radical design furniture and lighting from the Memphis Group.

The directors normally wrote all their own material. However, they were contacted by Michael Eisner, who became head of Disney after working with the trio at Paramount. According to David Zucker, Eisner "said he had a script that we wouldn't be able to turn down and he was right. It was too good. It was very well written with great characters. And hey we wouldn't have to leave town to do it."

While directing Jerry Zucker would be on set talking to the actors while the other two would watch from monitors and give comments.

Reception
 
The film was a financial success, grossing $71.6 million compared to the relatively frugal budget of the film's production. It was Disney's highest-grossing film (excluding reissues). Ruthless People received critical acclaim. On review aggregator Rotten Tomatoes, the film holds a "Certified Fresh" approval rating of 93% based on 43 reviews, with an average score of 7.1/10. The website's critical consensus reads, "It's sometimes crude and tasteless, but Ruthless People wrings acid-soaked laughs out of its dark premise and gleefully misanthropic characters." On Metacritic, the film received a score of 78 based on 15 reviews, indicating "generally favorable reviews". Audiences polled by CinemaScore gave the film an average grade of "A−" on an A+ to F scale.

Roger Ebert said that the film "is made out of good performances, a script of diabolical ingenuity, and a whole lot of silliness." Leonard Maltin agreed that this "clever farce" has "lots of laughs, bright performances, but turns sour: these really are unpleasant people!"

Although it has been perceived that Ruthless People was influenced by O. Henry's story "The Ransom of Red Chief", writer Dale Launer claims that it was inspired by the kidnapping of Patricia Hearst and that the similarities between the film and the earlier story were a coincidence.

Soundtrack

The album's soundtrack was released on Epic Records. The track, "Waiting to See You" by Dan Hartman, is missing the first several drum bars on the CD release contained on the vinyl and cassette releases. The soundtrack version of "Ruthless People" is similar to the version heard in the film, including both an extended intro and a second verse edited out of the single version.

Track list
 "Ruthless People" – Mick Jagger
 "Give Me the Reason" – Luther Vandross
 "Modern Woman" – Billy Joel
 "Wherever I Lay My Hat (That's My Home)" – Paul Young
 "No Say In It" – Machinations
 "Waiting to See You" – Dan Hartman
 "Dance Champion" – Kool and The Gang
 "Neighborhood Watch" – Michel Colombier
 "Stand on It" – Bruce Springsteen
 "Don't You Want My Love" – Nicole McCloud

Charts

See also

 Too Many Crooks

References

Notes

Citations

External links

 
 

1986 films
Touchstone Pictures films
Adultery in films
American black comedy films
American crime comedy films
1980s black comedy films
Films about kidnapping
American films about revenge
Films directed by Jim Abrahams
Films directed by David Zucker (director)
Films directed by Jerry Zucker
Films with screenplays by Dale Launer
Films scored by Michel Colombier
Films shot in Los Angeles
1986 comedy films
1980s English-language films
1980s American films